Plum Lovin' is a 2007 novel by Janet Evanovich. It is the 14th book in the Stephanie Plum series.

In this Valentine's Day between the numbers novella bounty hunter Stephanie Plum is tracking down Annie Hart, a relationship expert, who was charged with armed robbery.  According to Stephanie's file Hart stole a necklace from a pawn shop owned by Stanley Cramp and shot him in the foot.  Vinnie is worried that if Hart isn't brought in soon he won't be able to afford the big champagne Valentine's Day cruise he is supposed to take with his wife Lucille.

Diesel is back and he's hunting down Bernie Beaner.  Bernie's marriage of thirty-five years has apparently gone down the crapper and he's blaming another Unmentionable for it, Annie Hart.  Until Diesel can take care of Bernie Beaner he's keeping Annie Hart in protective custody.  The only problem is that Annie won't give up her work and has Diesel promise to make sure all of her clients have a good Valentine's Day.  Diesel passes this task off to Stephanie for a hundred dollars and a promise that she won't have to do anything illegal or life-threatening.

Annie Hart's Cases
Annie Hart has five cases that Stephanie and Diesel work their way through while they hunt down Bernie Beaner. Charlene Klinger is forty-two years old, divorced with four children, originally from New Hampshire and works for the DMV. Her deadbeat ex-husband is on a beach in Santa Barbara and hasn't sent child support in over a year. When Stephanie and Diesel visit her at her house the cat's tail catches on fire. Diesel manages to put out the fire with orange juice but then the dog slips and hurts his leg. It's early on a Saturday morning and it would cost a small fortune to go to an emergency clinic. Luckily, Stephanie knows someone who can help.

Gary Martin is a forty-year-old, five foot six, bald and chubby veterinarian who has never been married.  Larry Burlew is a six-foot-tall, 230 pound, soft spoken and very shy butcher. Jeanine Chan is thirty-five and involved with a great guy, unfortunately she continues to run into a problem with men and needs help to fix it.

Albert Kloughn is the fifth person.  Albert is a bald, Jewish, lawyer who works next to a laundromat, and looks like the Pillsbury dough boy. Albert and Stephanie's sister Valerie have one daughter together already, named Lisa.  Albert and Valerie have tried to get married but ran away to Disneyland instead.  Valerie is pregnant again and Stephanie is absolutely determined to get Albert to marry her sister. Stephanie says that she is marrying Diesel at her parents house to get Valerie and Albert there while Annie gets the paperwork and the Justice of the Peace, and Lula and Connie get a wedding cake. A quick place change and even faster vows and Valerie and Albert are finally married.

1999 novels
Stephanie Plum books